Mark Austin may refer to:

 Mark Austin (journalist) (born 1958), British journalist
 Mark Austin (footballer) (born 1989), Australian rules footballer
 Mark Austin (composer) (born 1958), New Zealand composer and musical director